Microplitis is a genus of braconid wasps in the family Braconidae. There are more than 190 described species in Microplitis, found throughout the world.

See also
 List of Microplitis species

References

Further reading

External links

 

Microgastrinae